Paris Trout is a 1988 American novel written by Pete Dexter. It was the winner of the National Book Award for Fiction.

The novel was adapted into a film of the same name.

Plot
In a small Georgia town in the 1950s, a bigoted store owner named Paris Trout kills a black man's younger sister and wounds his mother when a car deal between them goes wrong.

Critical reception
The Los Angeles Times called the novel "a masterpiece, complex and breath-taking."

References

1988 American novels
English-language novels
American novels adapted into films
Novels set in Georgia (U.S. state)
Novels set in the 1950s
Random House books